A foreign body, in physiology, any object originating outside a human or animal body.  

The terms foreign body, foreign bodies, or foreign object may also refer to:

Media
Foreign Body (1986 film), a 1986 film directed by Ronald Neame, based on 1975 Roderick Mann's eponymous 1975 novel
Foreign Body (2016 film), a 2016 Tunisian film
Foreign Body (Cook novel), a novel by Robin Cook
Foreign Bodies (Amanda Craig book), a book by Amanda Craig
Foreign Bodies (Barbara Harrison novel), a novel by Barbara Grizzuti Harrison
Foreign Bodies, a novel by Cynthia Ozick
Foreign Bodies, a novel by Hwee Hwee Tan
Foreign Bodies, 2001 orchestral composition by Esa-Pekka Salonen
Foreign Body (album), 2012 collaborative album of Grouper and Tiny Vipers under their pseudonym Mirrorring
Foreign Body (web series), a 2008 webseries and prequel to eponymous Robin Cook's 2009 novel

Other uses
Foreign object (professional wrestling), any outside object introduced into a match meant to give the user an unfair advantage
Foreign object damage, in aerospace or engineering, damage to a vehicle or device caused by any object not part of it